Woodhouselee is a locality in the Upper Lachlan Shire, New South Wales, Australia. It lies about 25 km northwest of Goulburn and 115 km northeast of Canberra.

Woodhouselee is said to have been named after an early settler called Woodhouse or to be a name given by William Lithgow to his "private township" after Woodhouselee, a small estate town south of Edinburgh, because of his early association as a student of the University of Edinburgh with the Tytler family.

Woodhouselee station was a station on the now disused Crookwell railway line from 1902 to 1975. Woodhouselee had a state public school from 1877 to 1893.

References

Upper Lachlan Shire
Localities in New South Wales
Southern Tablelands